Josephina Johanna "Jopie" Troost (born 19 September 1942) is a retired Dutch swimmer who competed at the 1960 Summer Olympics in the 4 × 100 m freestyle relay. A medal favorite, the Dutch team was disqualified in the heats for a premature start by Sieta Posthumus. Troost was part of 4 × 100 m freestyle relay teams that set three national records in 1958.

References

1942 births
Living people
Swimmers from Amsterdam
Dutch female freestyle swimmers
Olympic swimmers of the Netherlands
Swimmers at the 1960 Summer Olympics
20th-century Dutch women